In the 1880s, Germany built a series of coastal defense ships to protect its coastline on the North and Baltic Seas. During the 1870s and early 1880s, the Imperial German Navy had built a number of ironclad warships of various designs. In the mid-1880s, however, dissatisfaction with the s and the rise of the Jeune École doctrine persuaded Leo von Caprivi, then the chief of the Imperial Navy to turn away from capital ship construction in favor of coastal defense ships and torpedo boats. These vessels were intended only for defense of German harbors. Six of them were built between 1888 and 1894.

All eight of the ships were heavily modernized between 1898 and 1904; the reconstruction included lengthening the ships and equipping them with new boilers. All eight ships were mobilized briefly at the start of World War I in August 1914 as the VI Battle Squadron, though by August 1915, they had all been withdrawn from service and employed in secondary roles. The rest were broken up for scrap by the early 1920s.

These coastal defense ships turned out to be a temporary diversion for the German fleet. In 1888, before any of the Siegfrieds or Odins had been laid down, Caprivi was selected to replace Chancellor Otto von Bismarck, who had been forced out of the position by the new Kaiser, Wilhelm II; Caprivi in turn was replaced by Vice Admiral Alexander von Monts. Monts, a veteran naval officer, opposed Caprivi's policy on coastal defense, and instead proposed building four new  s. These ships replaced what would have been the last two of the coastal defenders for which Caprivi had called. This set Germany on the trend of building large, ocean-going battleships for the next two decades. Indeed, Grand Admiral Alfred von Tirpitz characterized the period the Siegfried and Odin classes were built, up to the passage of the First Naval Law in 1898, as the "wasted decade".



Siegfried class

In 1883, when General Leo von Caprivi became the chief of the Imperial Navy, he discarded the fleet policy of his predecessor, Albrecht von Stosch, in favor of creating a fleet that could defend Germany's coast. To that end, he called for the construction of new coastal defense ships that were larger than the unsuccessful s but smaller than the s. They were to be sufficiently seaworthy to permit use in the North Sea, with armament and armor strong enough to allow them to engage larger, foreign battleships. Caprivi requested ten such vessels, though only eight would be built, the first six to the Siegfried design.

The six Siegfried class ships were used in fleet maneuvers throughout the 1890s, until they were reconstructed at the end of the decade. The modernization included re-boilering and lengthening, both of which improved the ships' speed. They were mobilized at the outbreak of World War I in August 1914, but remained on active service for only a year; in August 1915, they were withdrawn and used for secondary roles, primarily as barracks ships. All of the ships, save , were scrapped after the end of the war. Frithjof was converted into a merchant ship instead, and operated until 1930, when she too was broken up for scrap.

Odin class

The Odin class, the seventh and eighth of Caprivi's proposed ten coastal defenders, was a modified version of the Siegfried design; the primary differences were a slightly improved armor layout, a second funnel, and two military masts.

The two Odin-class ships were also rebuilt, in 1901–1904, and received the same modifications as the Siegfried-class vessels. Their service histories were largely identical to the Siegfrieds; they served with the fleet from their commissioning, and were mobilized at the outbreak of war in August 1914 before being relegated to secondary duties in August 1915. Both ships were rebuilt as merchantmen after the end of the war; Odin served in this capacity until she was scrapped in 1935, while Ägirs career was cut short when she ran aground off the Swedish island of Gotland in December 1929.

See also
 List of ironclads

Footnotes

Notes

Citations

References

Further reading
 

Coastal